Margaret Fuller (1810–1850) was an American journalist, critic, and women's rights advocate.

Margaret Fuller may also refer to:
Margaret T. Fuller, American developmental biologist
Margaret Fuller (curler), curler in the British Columbia Scotties Tournament of Hearts

See also
Fuller (surname)
Margaret Fuller House, birthplace and childhood home of the women's rights advocate